Elena Simperl FBCS (born May 1978) is professor of computer science in the Department of Informatics at King's College London. She trained as a computer scientist at the Technical University of Munich and completed a PhD in knowledge engineering (Dr rer nat) at the Free University Berlin in 2007 and is best known for her work in human-machine collectives, with applications to crowdsourcing, citizen science, knowledge communities, and human data interaction, and for her leadership in data-driven innovation and data policy. According to AMiner, she is in the top 100 most influential scholars in knowledge engineering of the last decade, as well as in the Women in AI 2000 ranking.

Career
Simperl is a fellow of the British Computer Society, President of the Semantic Web Science Association and a former Turing Fellow.

Simperl serves as scientific advisor of data.europa.eu, Europe's flagship initiative in opening up public sector datasets for wider use.

She was the director of Data Pitch, a data innovation programme helping start-ups solve societal challenges through shared data and also the director of Open Data Incubator for Europe (ODINE). which supported start-ups in generating value from open data.

References

1978 births
Living people
Fellows of the British Computer Society
Technical University of Munich alumni
Free University of Berlin alumni
Academics of King's College London
British women computer scientists
Knowledge engineering researchers